The Sun Trail is a children's fantasy novel and the first book in Erin Hunter's Warriors: Dawn of the Clans series. Published on 5 March 2013, it was the first novel in a six-novel prequel arc published following the previous arc, Warriors: Omen of the Stars, though was immediately preceded in publication by the novella Cloudstar's Journey. It was followed by the second novel in the series, Thunder Rising. The novel centers on a group of feral cats living before the rise of the five Clans in the other main Warriors series.

Series overview
Warriors: Dawn of the Clans acts as a prequel arc within the Warriors series and explains how the Clans of wild cats that are central to the series came to be, as well as detailing the early days of the Clans, including the formation of the warrior code, a code of honor followed by the warrior cats, and early Clan hierarchy. The Sun Trail takes place during a time when the Clans had not yet formed.

Plot
The Sun Trail begins with a group of cats known as the Tribe of Rushing Water, led by Stoneteller, starving due to lack of food in their mountain home. Stoneteller receives a vision in which she is told that there is more prey if one follows the rising Sun. When one of the Tribe's kits dies of hunger, a group of Tribe cats decides to follow the "Sun trail" as described to Stoneteller in her vision, in search of a solution to their situation. However, a kit named Jagged Peak sneaks out of the Tribe's cave to catch up to his older brother, Clear Sky, who is in the group of Tribe cats who have left. This prompts their mother to ask their other brother, Gray Wing, to follow Jagged Peak. Gray Wing reluctantly agrees, saving Jagged Peak from an eagle attack before they catch up to Clear Sky's group. 

During a nighttime stop on their journey, the cats are attacked by a trio of eagles who carry away Clear Sky's mate, Bright Stream, when she saves Gray Wing from the eagles. Bright Stream kills the eagle carrying her but falls to her death. In the aftermath, a rift forms between Clear Sky and Gray Wing because Gray Wing believes that Clear Sky blames him for Bright Stream's death. However, it is later revealed by Clear Sky that he blames himself for Bright Stream's death; the brothers reconcile after Gray Wing suggests that the death was simply a terrible accident of nobody's fault. Shortly after Bright Stream's death, the journeying cats leave their mountain territory and enter unfamiliar terrain. Their journey is continued in the sequel, Thunder Rising.

References

2013 American novels
2013 children's books
Warriors (novel series)
Novels about cats
HarperCollins books